Bembidion transparens is a species of ground beetle in the family Carabidae. It is found in North America and Europe.

Subspecies
These three subspecies belong to the species Bembidion transparens:
 Bembidion transparens prostratum (Motschulsky, 1844)
 Bembidion transparens transparens (Gebler, 1830)
 Trepanes transparens transparens (Gebler, 1829)

References

Further reading

 

transparens
Articles created by Qbugbot
Beetles described in 1830